The Derby of Thessaloniki, Derby of Macedonia, or Derby of Northern Greece, is a football local rivalry between Aris and PAOK, both of which are based in Thessaloniki, Macedonia, Greece. Aris play their home games at the Kleanthis Vikelidis Stadium in Charilaou district of eastern Thessaloniki, while PAOK are based at the Toumba Stadium in the neighbouring Toumba district. The two stadiums are 1.54 km apart.

History

Social rivalry

The rivalry between these two Thessalonian clubs can be traced back to the interwar period, where a rivalry began between upper class local Greeks (Αris fans) and Greek refugees (PAOK fans). These refugees were mostly working class migrants from Asia Minor and Constantinople. They settled in the region of Macedonia after the population exchange between Greece and Turkey in 1923. The antagonism between those social groups has been expressed in many ways and one of them was football.

Football rivalry

Aris were founded in 1914 and PAOK in 1926. On 12 June 1927, the first derby of Thessaloniki took place, ending with a 2–1 PAOK victory. Up to 1959, the two teams were fighting for the Macedonia Football Clubs Association (EPSM) local championship title and they also met some times in the final stage of the Panhellenic Championship. In 1959, the Alpha Ethniki - the precursor of the current Super League - was set up as a national round-robin tournament. Aris vs PAOK rivalry has continued to grow more and more heated over the years as the two clubs battle for supremacy in Northern Greece.

Other rivalries
Aris and PAOK are traditional rivals in other sports as well, especially basketball, where in the 1980s they were competing for the Championship.

Statistics

Head-to-head

1 Including play-off games

Record Alpha Ethniki win
 Aris 
 Home: Aris – PAOK 5–1, Kleanthis Vikelidis Stadium (27 February 1966)(Alexiadis 24', Psifidis 43', Chatzikostas 65' pen., Siropoulos 69', 75' – Koudas 60' pen.)
 Away: PAOK – Aris 1–4, Toumba Stadium (30 August 1998)(Kafes 63' – Charisteas 15', 54', Koulakiotis 68' o.g., Panopoulos 73')
 PAOK 
 Home: PAOK – Aris 5–0, Toumba Stadium (16 February 1975)(Paridis 23', Koudas 28', 51', Tsilingiridis 66', Sarafis 87')
 Away: Aris – PAOK 0–4, Kleanthis Vikelidis Stadium (7 December 1994)(Toursounidis 22', 57', Lagonidis 61', Bociek 90'+2')
Bigger grade difference
 Aris 
 Point system 3–2–1:   +8 (75 vs 67), 1967–68
 Point system 2–1–0:   +6 (47 vs 41), 1979–80 and (33 vs 27), 1985-86
 Point system 3–1–0: +15 (50 vs 35), 2007–08
 PAOK 
 Point system 3–2–1: +23 (92 vs 69), 1972–73 
 Point system 2–1–0: +16 (46 vs 30), 1984-85
 Point system 3–1–0: +47 (69 vs 22), 2013–14
Attendance records in Alpha Ethniki
 Aris home: 
27,000 Aris – PAOK 1–0, Kleanthis Vikelidis Stadium (25 March 1979)
26,000 Aris – PAOK 0–1, Kleanthis Vikelidis Stadium (16 November 1980)
24,589 Aris – PAOK 2–0, Kleanthis Vikelidis Stadium (7 October 1979)
 PAOK home: 
44,486 PAOK – Aris 1–0, Toumba Stadium (28 January 1973)
42,795 PAOK – Aris 2–0, Toumba Stadium (3 February 1980)
42,296 PAOK – Aris 2–2, Toumba Stadium (22 February 1976)

Match list

Super League Greece (1959 — present)

1 PAOK in 7th place and Aris in 8th place, due to better goal average in regular season.

•There were no games in 1997–98 , 2005–06 , 2014–15 , 2015–16 , 2016–17 , 2017–18 seasons due to the relegation of Aris to lower divisions.

Greek Cup

1 The original match was played on 26 March 1950 at Sintrivani Stadium. It was interrupted in the 85th minute, while Aris were leading by 1–0.

2 Match suspended at 89th minute because Aris players started a fight with the referee.

3 Final group standings: PAOK 7 (q), Ergotelis 4 (q), Aris 4, Aittitos Spata 1.
• Series won: Aris 7, PAOK 9.

Top scorers
Including all the Alpha Ethniki and Greek Cup games since 1959–60.

Three goals for Aris: Petkakis, Pallas, Kouis, Zelilidis Cámpora and Aganzo.
Three goals for PAOK: Fountoukidis, Apostolidis, Paridis, Orfanos, Borbokis, Lagonidis, Zouboulis, Yiasoumi and Athanasiadis.
Giorgos Koutsis has scored once for Aris against PAOK and once for PAOK against Aris.

Head-to-head ranking in Super League Greece

• Total: PΑΟΚ 45 times higher, Aris 18 times higher.

European records

Aris

PAOK

Last updated: 11 August 2022

Men in both teams

References

External links
Footballderbies.com

Greece football derbies
Aris Thessaloniki
PAOK